Geminella minor is a species of filamentous freshwater green alga in the family Chlorellaceae. The species probably has a cosmopolitan distribution. The type specimen came from Switzerland and the species has been reported in the British Isles and elsewhere in the northern hemisphere, including Japan, Ukraine and  North America. It occurs in freshwater aquatic habitats.

References 

Chlorellaceae